The Scavenger is an album by jazz cornetist Nat Adderley released on the Milestone label featuring performances by Adderley's Quintet with Joe Henderson, Joe Zawinul, Victor Gaskin, and Roy McCurdy with a guest appearance by Jeremy Steig. The track "Rise, Sally, Rise" was sampled by rap group Eric B. & Rakim for their 1992 single "Know the Ledge".

Reception
The Allmusic review by awarded the album 2 stars.

Track listing
All compositions by Nat Adderley except as indicated
 "The Scavenger" (Joe Zawinul) - 8:07 
 "Bittersweet" - 4:45 
 "But Not For Me" (George Gershwin, Ira Gershwin) - 5:53 
 "Sweet Emma" - 4:47 
 "Rise, Sally, Rise" - 5:19 
 "Unilateral" - 5:58 
 "Melnat" - 3:00 
Recorded in New York City on January 18 & 19, 1968

Personnel
Nat Adderley – cornet, trumpet
Mel Lastie (tracks 2, 4, 5 & 7) – cornet
Joe Henderson (tracks 1, 3, & 7) - tenor saxophone
Joe Zawinul - piano, electric piano
Victor Gaskin - bass
Roy McCurdy - drums 
Jeremy Steig (track 1)  - flute

References

1968 albums
Atlantic Records albums
Nat Adderley albums